Rangiye Diye Jao is a Bengali Romance drama series that premiered on 11 December 2017 on Zee Bangla and stopped on 15 June 2018. The series is produced Saugata Nandi and Ekta Kapoor under their banner Chayabani Balaji Entertainment. Jeetu Kamal, Raja Ghosh and Tumpa Ghosh play the protagonists in the series. The series is a remake of Zee Marathi drama series Lagira Zhala Ji.

Plot summary 
The story of Rangiye Diye Jao revolves around the love for the nation and the love for the beloved. It is a patriotic, romantic comedy drama. Bablu (Jeetu Kamal) belongs to a small village called Begumpur. He is a dedicated follower of Netaji Subhash Chandra Bose and is nurturing a dream of joining Indian Army and serve the nation, for which he is preparing himself to achieve. Bablu has already lost his parents in a mine explosion and grows up in a village. Since he lost his parents in an explosion, he wants to be in the army and fight against the extremists. If needed, he is even ready to sacrifice his own life for his country. That's his ideology. Shiuli (Tumpa Ghosh) plays Bablu's love interest. Bablu and Shiuli, in spite of a sparkling chemistry between themselves, can't stand each other's presence. But slowly they fall in love.
Later on, Shiuli's family arranges her marriage with Vikram, who turns out to be an illegal arms businessman. On the other side, Bablu gets chance in army training. Bablu, works with the army to capture Vikram and successes. Bablu marries Shiuli under the situation.

Cast
Jeetu Kamal as Bablu 
Raja Ghosh as Avijeet 
Tumpa Ghosh as Shiuli 
 Phalguni Chatterjee as Shiuli's grandfather
Chumki Chowdhary as Shiuli's Mother
 Soumi Banerjee as Shiuli's Close Friend
 Neil Chatterjee as Vikram
 Rohit Mukherjee as Avijeet's Father
 Reshmi Sen as Avijeet's Mother
 Simron Upadhyay as Avijeet's Sister 
 Indranil Mallick as Avijeet's Brother
 Elfina Mukherjee as Avijeet's Sister 
 Royshreemaa Das as Soumi

Adaptations

References

External links 
 Official Website

Balaji Telefilms television series
2016 Indian television series debuts
Bengali-language television programming in India
Zee Bangla original programming